Torfinn Haukås (1931–1993) was a Norwegian novelist.

He was born in Høyanger. Notable novels include 63 Johnsen (1958), Meg skal dere aldri få tak i (1967), Søndag i Andorra (1977) and Duellen (crime, 1981).

References

1931 births
1993 deaths
20th-century Norwegian novelists
People from Høyanger